Tom Hill is a mountain in Barnstable County, Massachusetts. Peters Hill is located north of Tom Hill.

References

Mountains of Massachusetts
Mountains of Barnstable County, Massachusetts